Edward Rufus Fleming (July 25, 1933 – April 10, 2002) was an American professional basketball player. Fleming was selected in the 1955 NBA Draft by the Rochester Royals after a collegiate career at Niagara. Although he played in both the National Basketball Association (NBA) and Eastern Professional Basketball League (EPBL), his career totals for NBA games only are 2,511 points, 1,532 rebounds and 544 assists in five seasons.

References

External links
Ed Fleming @ TheDraftReview

1933 births
2002 deaths
American men's basketball players
Basketball players from Pittsburgh
Minneapolis Lakers players
Niagara Purple Eagles men's basketball players
Rochester Royals draft picks
Rochester Royals players
Shooting guards
Small forwards
Sunbury Mercuries players
Wilkes-Barre Barons players